Waṇetsi , commonly called Tarīno, and sometimes Tsalgari, is a distinct variety of Pashto and is considered by some to be a different language. In some cases, Wanetsi rather shares similarities with the Pamir language of Munji, showing to be something of a bridge between the former and Pashto. It is perhaps a representation for a more archaic, or very early, form of Pashto.

It is spoken by the Spin Tareen tribe in Pakistan and Afghanistan, primarily in Harnai (هرنای) (Harnai District) and Chawter (چوتېر) area in Sanjawi, Northern Balochistan, Pakistan. The Tarīno or Waṇetsi is at risk due to lack of attention.

History 
Professor Prods Oktor Skjærvø states:

According to Encyclopædia Iranica Waṇetsi branched off from the other Pashto dialects in the Middle Iranian stage:

Research 

The first known linguistic research was conducted in 1929 by Georg Morgenstierne on Waṇetsi. Since then linguists like Josef Elfenbein have worked and researched on this archaic Pashto dialect. In his book, Syed Khair Muhammad Arif,  "Tarin aw Tarīno" has also included a small dictionary of Waṇetsi. ٙBut much work remains to be done on understanding Waṇetsi.

Poetry 
The Waṇetsi Poet Nizamuddin Nizami Tarin, a Spin Tarin from Chawter, has also compiled poetry in the language. An excerpt from his poem in Waṇetsi:

Music 
The singer Khayam Tareen (خيام ترين) has also sung songs in Waṇetsi.

Phonology

Consonants 

 Waṇetsi has  [] and [] for Pashto ښ and ږ, respectively.
 څ does not merge with [s] but can be pronounced as [] and ځ does not merge with [z] but can be pronounced as [].
[] is dropable in Waṇetsi e.g. هغه becomes اغه

Vowels 

 Josef Elfenbein states: "ī and ū are not phonemically distinct from i and u respectively, and are pronounced [i] and [u] respectively when unstressed (and not [ɪ] and [ʊ] as in Kākaṛī), and [iː] and [uː] when stressed."
 There is a marked spontaneous tendency to palatalize "ī" as "yī" and "ē" as "yē"; and to labialize "ū" as "wū" and "ō" as "wo". Initial delabialization is common in "wū" as "ū" and "wō" as "ō".
The stressed short "á" is often lengthened, and an unstressed long "ā" shortened.
 The standard weakening of final vowels in Waṇetsi makes the masculine-feminine gender distinction much less audible: [ə] and [a] are not phonemically distinct when unstressed in any position. But stressed final ә́ is kept apart from stressed á as in general Pashto.

Nasalisation 
Waṇetsi also has vowel nasalisation which is transcribed as / ̃/ or ں in the Pashto alphabet.

Stress

Verbs 
Like Pashto, verbs have final stress in the imperfective aspect and initial stress in the perfective aspect.

Examples:

Words 
Stress can also change the meaning of words, as in Pashto.

Example:

Subdialects 
Tarīno is subdivided into the Harnāi variety and the Chawter variety.

Grammatical comparison with general Pashto

Adpositions

Possessive 
The possessive postposition غه is used instead of د

Example:

Idiomatic Expression 
Tareeno also varies from Pashto in idiomatic expression.

Example: نهير /nahī́r/  “thought” - used with the verb to hit

Verbal Suffixes

First Person Suffix 
The first person verbal suffixes also change:

Second Person Suffix 
Some verbal suffixes like the feminine third person suffix [ه and ې] are the same:

Third Person Suffix

Past Suffix 
Like standard Pashto the third person suffix for verbs with the root  وتل the third person past suffix is different for the singular and plural.

Comparison with general Pashto

Poetry 
The following is provided by Zamir Gulbahar (ظمير ګلبهار), a Tareeno poet from Harnai:

Lexical Comparison 
The following list has been provided by the Waṇetsi poet Nizamuddin Nizami

Sentence Comparison

Sample 1 
The following examples have been provided by Nizamuddin Nizami

Sample 2 
The following examples have been provided by Nizamuddin Nizami

Sample 3 
The following examples have been provided by Nizamuddin Nizami

Sample 4 
The following examples have been provided by Nizamuddin Nizami

Grammar

Nouns - Morphology

Class 1 

 Masculine Animate: mə́ser - elder (In general Pashto: mə́sər

 Masculine Animate: lewә́- wolf 

 Masculine Animate: xar- donkey

 Masculine Animate:  pšə́ - tom-cat (in general Pashto: piš)

 Masculine Inanimate: dārū́ - medicine

 Masculine Inanimate: kor - house

 Feminine Animate:  pšī - cat (in general Pashto: piśó)

 Feminine Inanimate: lyār - way (in general Pashto: lār)

 Feminine Inanimate: xwā́šī - mother-in-law

 Feminine Inanimate: čaṛə́ - mother-in-law

 Feminine Inanimate: lergā́ - stick

Class 2 

 Masculine Animate: yirźá - bear (in general Pashto: يږ [yәẓ̌, yәg, yәź])

 Masculine Animate: spa -dog  (in general Pashto:  spáy)

 Masculine Inanimate: wagaṛá -village  (in general Pashto: kə́lay)

 Feminine Animate:  spī - female-dog (in general Pashto spə́i)

Class 3 

 Masculine Inanimate:  špaźmi -moon  (in general Pashto spoẓ̌mə́i, a feminine noun)

 Feminine Inanimate: méle -celebration  (in general Pashto melá)

Class 4 

 Masculine Animate: spor- horseman

 Masculine Inanimate:  rebún - shirt

Class 5 

 Masculine Animate: ğal

Agglutinative Formation 
The (e)ya case is agglutinative.

Demonstratives 
In Waṇetsi اغه [aɣa] functions for both Pashto دغه (this) and هغه (that).

Verb Infinitive 
Where as General Pashto employs the ل [ә́l] to the past stem to make it infinitive, Waṇetsi employs نګ [ang] to the past stem to make it infinitive.

Bibliography 

 J. H. Elfenbein, (1984). "The Wanetsi Connexion: Part I". Journal of the Royal Asiatic Society of Great Britain and Ireland (1): 54–76. 
 J. H. Elfenbein, (1984). "The Wanetsi Connexion: Part II". Journal of the Royal Asiatic Society of Great Britain and Ireland (2): 229–241.
 J. H Elfenbein, (1967). "Lanḍa Zor Wəla Waṇecī". Archiv Orientální. XXXV: 563–606.

See also
Pashto Dialects
Pashto Grammar
Wazirwola
Ormuri language
Pamiri languages

References

External links 
Word list of terms in Waṇetsi and other languages



Pashto dialects